Giuseppe Orazio Capretti (1641 - 7 March 1725) was an Italian painter.

Biography
He was born in Almè, Province of Bergamo. He moved to Rome in 1673 to pursue training. Returning to Lombardy, he painted mainly sacred subjects, painting for the church of San Francesco in Correggio. He died in the latter town.

References

1641 births
1725 deaths
Artists from the Province of Bergamo
17th-century Italian painters
Italian male painters
18th-century Italian painters
18th-century Italian male artists